Slavomír Kňazovický (born 3 May 1967 in Piešťany) is a Czechoslovak-Slovak sprint canoer who competed from the early 1990s to the early 2000s (decade). Competing in three Summer Olympics, he won a silver in the C-1 500 m event at Atlanta in 1996.

An out-and-out sprinter, his preferred distance was in fact the 200 m (not included on the Olympic schedule). In 1997 he became European C-1 200 m champion in Plovdiv, Bulgaria. The following year he won the silver medal in Szeged, Hungary. In 1999 he was a bronze medallist at both the World and European Championships. Kňazovický also earned a bronze in the C-4 500 m event at the 1994 World championships in Mexico City.

Kňazovický is now the coach of the current Slovakian number one Marián Ostrčil.

References

Sports-reference.com profile

1967 births
Canoeists at the 1992 Summer Olympics
Canoeists at the 1996 Summer Olympics
Canoeists at the 2000 Summer Olympics
Czechoslovak male canoeists
Living people
Olympic canoeists of Czechoslovakia
Olympic canoeists of Slovakia
Olympic silver medalists for Slovakia
Slovak male canoeists
Sportspeople from Piešťany
Olympic medalists in canoeing
ICF Canoe Sprint World Championships medalists in Canadian
Medalists at the 1996 Summer Olympics